No Fear, No Blame is a 1962 Soviet drama film directed by Aleksandr Mitta.

Plot 
The film tells about the business trip Repnin, which is sent with the equipment to Moscow. Having shipped the equipment, he had to fly to the Bailout, but he lost all his money. Three kids find them and decide to go in search of the owner. The film uses the adventurous plot to espouse values like honesty and chivalry.

Cast 
 Alla Vitruk
 Viktor Glazkov
 Nikolay Burlyaev
 Saveliy Kramarov
 Nikolay Volkov
 Lev Zolotukhin
 Marina Strizhenova
 Lyudmila Marchenko		
 Anatoli Yushko
 Yelena Maksimova

References

External links 
 

1962 films
1960s Russian-language films
Soviet drama films
1962 drama films
Films directed by Alexander Mitta